Aaliyah
 Angela Bofill
 Amerie
 Ashanti
 Brandy
 CeCe Peniston
 Cherrelle
 Chris Brown
 Ciara
 Colonel Abrams
 Crystal Waters
 Dru Hill
 Fergie
 Frankie J
 Ginuwine
 H-Town
 Jaguar Wright
 Jennifer Lopez
 Joi Cardwell
 Justin Timberlake
 Kai
 Karyn White
 Kelis
 Kelly Rowland
 LeToya Luckett
 La Toya Jackson
 LaToya London
 Meli'sa Morgan
 Miki Howard
 Millie Jackson
 Millie Scott
 Missy Elliott
 Morris Day
 Nelly Furtado
 Omarion
 Perri "Pebbles" Reid
 Peggy Scott-Adams
 Regina Belle
 Rihanna
 Samantha Fox
 Shanice
 Sharon Redd
 Sisqó
 Soulhead
 Taylor Dayne
 Teena Marie

Urban contemporary artists